The Convair XSM-74 was a subsonic, jet-powered, ground-launched decoy cruise missile.

Development

In March 1953, the United States Air Force released General Operational Requirement (GOR) 16 which called for a long range decoy missile to increase the effectiveness of Strategic Air Command bombers by confusing and saturating an air defense system. Multiple XSM-74 missiles would be ground-launched from Strategic Air Command bases located in the United States. Fifty percent of the deployed XSM-74 missiles would be launched within the first hour after an alert and the remaining missiles would be launched one hour later. The requirement called for 85 percent of the decoy missiles to arrive at the target area within . The XSM-74 was to fly  at speed of at least Mach 0.85 at an operating altitude of 50,000 ft (15,240 m) with a payload of 500 lb (227 kg). After flying , the XSM-74 would simulate the performance of the B-47 Stratojet or B-52 Stratofortress over the final  of flight.

Study contracts were awarded to Convair and Fairchild in July 1954 by the United States Air Force under the project designation MX-2223. According to USAF records, the designation XSM-74 was proposed for the MX-2223 missile, but never actually approved.

The Convair MX-2223 design called for a non-metallic fuselage with swept wings and a v-tail. Radar reflectors were located in the fuselage and on pods positioned on the wing tips to simulate the radar return of a bomber.

Development of the XSM-74 was suspended in December 1955 when Fairchild was awarded a contract by the USAF to develop the XSM-73 Goose.

Variants
MX-2223: Original U.S. Air Force Project Designator.
XSM-74: Designation reserved for prototypes

Operator
 
 United States Air Force

See also

References

 SM-74, Directory of U.S. Military Rockets and Missiles - Appendix 1: Early Missiles and Drones, by Andreas Parsch 

1950s United States special-purpose aircraft
Unmanned aerial vehicles of the United States
Decoy missiles of the United States
Cold War missiles of the United States
Cruise missiles of the Cold War
Cruise missiles of the United States
SM-074